Sadiq Saadoun Abdul-Ridha (born 12 June 1972) is an Iraqi former footballer who played as a defender.

At club level, he has played for Anyang LG Cheetahs in South Korea and Al-Talaba SC in Iraq. Internationally Saadoun represented Iraq in the 2000 Asian Cup. He missed the 1996 Asian Cup in the United Arab Emirates, but was recalled by Milan Zivadinovic for the 2000 Asian Cup in Lebanon. He also scored 4 goals in the 1997 edition of the friendly international tournament Nehru Cup, which was won by Iraq.

Career statistics

International
Scores and results list Iraq's goal tally first.

Managerial career
Saadoun has managed many teams, Al-Talaba (Iraq), Al-Hussein (Iraq), and is coaching Al-Diwaniya (Iraq) now.

Al-Diwaniya 
Saadoun signed for Al-Diwaniya in August of the 2019-2020 season, after the leave of Razzaq Farhan.

Managerial statistics

References

External links
 
 

Iraqi footballers
Iraqi expatriate footballers
Al-Quwa Al-Jawiya players
Al-Shorta SC players
Al-Khutoot Al-Jawiya players
Salahaddin FC players
Al-Talaba SC players
Iraq international footballers
Association football defenders
2000 AFC Asian Cup players
Living people
1972 births
K League 1 players
FC Seoul players
Expatriate footballers in South Korea
Expatriate footballers in Lebanon
Iraqi expatriate sportspeople in Lebanon
Akhaa Ahli Aley FC players
Lebanese Premier League players
Al-Talaba SC managers